The 2017 season is Penangs 91st competitive season, 2nd consecutive season in the top flight of Malaysian football, and 96th year in existence as a football club. The season covers the period from 1 November 2016 to 31 October 2017.

Month by month review

November 2016
On 28 November, Ashley Westwood was unveiled as the new head coach of Penang, signing a two-year contract. On 30 November, Penang received RM 4 millions allocation from the state government.

December 2016
On 1 December, Penang confirmed that Legea will be the official kit manufacturer for three years from 2017. 
On 5 December, Penang announced it had retained 16 players from last season. On 22 December, it was announced that on the FA Cup second round, Penang will play at away against MPKB-BRI U-BeS. On 30 December, it was announced that on the opening day, Penang will kick-off the season at away against Selangor.

January
Penang won its first pre-season match, against Felcra FC, which ended in a 2–0 victory. In the following match four days later, Penang won 2–1 against PDRM. On 9 January, Faiz Subri won the 2016 FIFA Puskás Award, becoming the first Asian to win the award. On 13 January, Penang confirmed the signings of Amirul Asyraf Suhaidi, K. Reuben, Yong Kuong Yong, Zulkhairi Zulkeply, Shazalee Ramlee, Nigel Dabinyaba, Diogo Ferreira and Andy Russell. Penang concluded its pre-season campaign with a 0–1 defeat to Nagaworld FC from Cambodia on the same day. On 18 January, Penang completed the signings of Syed Adney and G. Mahathevan, while Elias Sulaiman and Darwira Sazan were released. Penang lost 0–2 in their opening match against Selangor on 21 January at Selayang. On 27 January, Penang lost again in the league campaign against Perak.

February
Penang recorded their third and fourth consecutive loss as they lost 0–1 to T-Team at away on 4 February and Sarawak at home on 11 February. Three days later, Penang finally scored the first goal of the season in the FA Cup match against MPKB-BRI U-BeS which was also the first victory of the season. The Panthers failed to arrest their four-match defeat and goalless streaks in the league as they were demolished by Pahang at away with the score 1–6. FIFA Puskas Award winner Faiz Subri ended his year-long goal drought but could not prevent Penang from going down 3–1 to Super League leaders Kedah in Alor Star on 25 February.

March
Penang picked up their first point of the season after coming from behind to hold Melaka United to a 1–1 draw at the State Stadium on 1 March. 3 days later, Penang recorded another 1–1 draw in Shah Alam against PKNS FC. On 11 March, Penang was knocked out from the FA Cup campaign, losing 1–4 to Negeri Sembilan after extra time in Paroi. The management board mutually terminated the contract of their coach, Ashley Westwood, following a spate of poor results in the M-League. On 24 March, Zainal Abidin Hassan was unveiled as Penang's head coach to replace the former.

April
After nine attempts, Penang finally achieved their first league victory of the season after defeating Felda United 1–0 at Tun Abdul Razak Stadium on 9 April. However, the panthers failed to continue the momentum, losing 1–5 to Kelantan at home 6 days later. Penang confirmed their absence from the Malaysia Cup for the second consecutive seasons as they lost 1–2 to Johor Darul Ta'zim at home on 26 April.

May
Despite Nigel Dabinyaba's fourth goal of the season, Penang moved closer to the drop after a 2–1 home defeat to Felda United on 7 May. 8 days later, Penang re-signed Darwira Sazan and Elias Sulaiman, Andy Russell and Diogo Ferreira were released on the same day. On 18 May, Penang confirmed the signings of Azidan Sarudin and R. Surendran from Kuala Lumpur and free Agent respectively. On the next day, former Gambia international, Sanna Nyassi signed with the team. New signing, Nyassi scored a brace in his debut with Penang against Kelantan which ended 2–2 on 24 May.

June
On 7 June, Penang completed the sixth transfer of the summer transfer window, signing former Sarawak's striker, Mark Hartmann. On the next day, Brandon McDonald signed with Penang, replacing Reinaldo Lobo who is injured.

July
Penang continued the losing streak, losing 0–2 to the Super League defending champion, Johor Darul Ta'zim at Johor Bahru on 1 July.

September
On 20 September 2017, Penang has been relegated to second-tier Malaysia Premier League next year. The club's fate has been sealed following the 2–0 home defeat to T-Team.

Coaching staff

Squad

 FP = Foreign player
 U21 = Under-21 player
 NR = Not registered

Transfers

In

 Winter: 

Summer:

Out

Winter: 

Summer:

Pre-season

Competitions

Overview

{| class="wikitable" style="text-align: center"
|-
!rowspan=2|Competition
!colspan=8|Record
|-
!
!
!
!
!
!
!
!
|-
| Super League

|-
| FA Cup

|-
! Total

Super League

League table

Results summary

Matches

FA Cup

Statistics

Squad statistics

Goalscorers
The list is sorted by shirt number when total goals are equal.

Clean sheets
The list is sorted by shirt number when total clean sheets are equal.

Disciplinary record 

1 point and 3 points are allocated to each yellow card and red card respectively for ranking purposes.

Summary

References

Malaysian football clubs 2017 season
2017
Penang F.C.